TRNA:m4X modification enzyme (TRM13, Trm13p, tRNA:Xm4 modification enzyme) is an enzyme with systematic name S-adenosyl-L-methionine:tRNAPro/His/Gly(GCC) (cytidine/adenosine4-2'-O)-methyltransferase. This enzyme catalyses the following chemical reaction

 (1) S-adenosyl-L-methionine + cytidine4 in tRNAPro  S-adenosyl-L-homocysteine + 2'-O-methylcytidine4 in tRNAPro
 (2) S-adenosyl-L-methionine + cytidine4 in tRNAGly(GCC)  S-adenosyl-L-homocysteine + 2'-O-methylcytidine4 in tRNAGly(GCC)
 (3) S-adenosyl-L-methionine + adenosine4 in tRNAHis  S-adenosyl-L-homocysteine + 2'-O-methyladenosine4 in tRNAHis

The enzyme from Saccharomyces cerevisiae 2'-O-methylates cytidine4 in tRNAPro and tRNAGly(GCC), and adenosine4 in tRNAHis.

References

External links 
 

EC 2.1.1